Mirosław Dreszer (born 28 August 1965 in Tychy) is a Polish former football player who played goalkeeper. He began playing for GKS 71 Tychy; he played in the Polish First Division in the 1984–85 season, and played for Legia Warsaw in the 1985–86 season in two matches.  In 1984, he started as the goalkeeper for the Polish U-18 national team, which finished in third place in the European Championship.  He then moved to GKS Katowice where he played for the next five seasons. He played a total of 57 matches in the Polish First Division season of 1990–91. During the final of the European Cup Winners' Cup in the 1986–87 season, he suffered a serious injury against Swiss team FC Sion.  The injury was caused by FC Sion striker Dominique Ciña and Dreszer later required a surgery to recover.

He has played in 171 matches in the Polish first and second division. Currently, he is a coach for Polonia Bytom.

References

External links
 

1965 births
Living people
Legia Warsaw players
GKS Katowice players
1. FC Magdeburg players
SV Eintracht Trier 05 players
VfL Osnabrück players
2. Bundesliga players
Polish footballers
People from Tychy
Sportspeople from Silesian Voivodeship
Association football goalkeepers